Abu Mohammed Abd al-Jalil ibn Wahbun better known as simply Ibn Wahbun (died 1090), was a poet from Al Andalus in the 11th century. He made his career at the court of Al-Mutamid in Sevilla and the Almoravid court in Marrakesh. He was born in Murcia ca. 1039/1049. He was murdered by Christian raiders on the road from Lorca to Murcia in 1087. One of his poems is the famous ode to the battle of Zalaca.

References

Encyclopaedia of Islam, Brill Publishers, Leiden, s.v. "Ibn Wahbūn".

11th-century writers from al-Andalus
Year of birth unknown
1087 deaths